Gridiron Gang is a 1993 documentary film about the Kilpatrick Mustangs' inaugural season in 1990. The film won an Outstanding Individual Achievement Award in Information Programming at the 43rd Primetime Emmy Awards. Louis Gossett Jr. hosted the documentary. Several scenes from the film are shown during the credits of the 2006 film Gridiron Gang, which was based on the Mustangs' 1990 season.

References

External links
 

1993 films
Documentary films about American football
Documentary films about incarceration in the United States
1993 documentary films
Films shot in Los Angeles County, California
Films set in Los Angeles County, California
1990s English-language films
1990s American films